Natalie Blake (born 4 December 1982) is a British powerlifter. She competed for England in the women's 61 kg event at the 2014 Commonwealth Games where she won a silver medal. She also competed at the 2018 Commonwealth Games where she came 6th in the lightweight event.

References 

1982 births
Living people
English female weightlifters
Commonwealth Games silver medallists for England
Powerlifters at the 2016 Summer Paralympics
Female powerlifters
Commonwealth Games medallists in weightlifting
Powerlifters at the 2014 Commonwealth Games
Powerlifters at the 2018 Commonwealth Games
Medallists at the 2014 Commonwealth Games